"Gonna Make You Mine" is a song from New Zealand singer Margaret Urlich. The song was released in April 1995 as the lead single from her third studio album, The Deepest Blue. The song peaked at number 29 in Australia in June 1995.

Track listing 
CD single/7" (Columbia 661362.2)
 "Gonna Make You Mine" – 4:10
 "Just Before You Go" – 5:19

Charts

References

External links 
 Gonna Make You Mine at Discogs

1995 songs
1995 singles
Margaret Urlich songs
Columbia Records singles
Songs written by Margaret Urlich
Songs written by Robyn Smith (record producer)